In linguistics, co-occurrence or cooccurrence is an above-chance frequency of occurrence of two terms (also known as coincidence or concurrence) from a text corpus alongside each other in a certain order. Co-occurrence in this linguistic sense can be interpreted as an indicator of semantic proximity or an idiomatic expression. Corpus linguistics and its statistic analyses reveal patterns of co-occurrences within a language and enable to work out typical collocations for its lexical items. A co-occurrence restriction is identified when linguistic elements never occur together. Analysis of these restrictions can lead to discoveries about the structure and development of a language.

Co-occurrence can be seen an extension of word counting in higher dimensions. Co-occurrence can be quantitatively described using measures like correlation or mutual information.

See also

 Distributional hypothesis
 Statistical semantics
 Co-occurrence matrix
 Co-occurrence networks
 Similarity measure
 Dice coefficient

References

Corpus linguistics